Mystic Circle is a German black metal band formed in Ludwigshafen, în 1992.

History
Mystic Circle was formed in 1992 in Ludwigshafen. The band originally played death metal and recorded a never-released rehearsal demo later that year. In 1993, the band split-up, but reformed in 1994 with a new line-up. They released several EPs before their debut LP was issued in December 1996. Following their 1998 release they toured with Marduk and Old Man's Child and played several large rock festivals. After their 1999 release Infernal Satanic Verses, their original drummer, Aarrrgon, left the group, and they had to use a drum machine to complete their tour.

By 2007, Beelzebub had left the band to pursue another long-awaited project called Gloomball. It was unknown at first whether Mystic Circle would replace Beelzebub and continue or call it quits, but Beelzebub stated on his personal Myspace page that Mystic Circle was "history".

In November 2021, Mystic Circle reformed and announced the release of their eponymous eighth studio album, the band's first in 16 years, which was released on February 4, 2022. In October 2022, the band announced their ninth album, Erzdämon, would be released in March 2023. In January 2023, the band released a new single, "The Scarecrow", and revealed the new album would be released on March 17.

Band members

Current members
 Graf von Beelzebub – vocals, bass guitar ; guitars, keyboards 
 Aaarrrgon – drums ; guitars, keyboards

Former members
 Thorsten Schenke – guitars 
 Dirk Meisner – guitars 
 Agamidion – guitars 
 Mephisto – guitars, keyboards 
 Baalsulgorr – keyboards 
 Isternos – guitars 
 Ezpharess – guitars, keyboards 
 Xeron – guitars 
 Maschtl Innerbichler – drums 
 Raziel – drums 
 Abyss – drums 
 Blizzard – drums 
 Necrodemon – drums 
 Dementum – drums 
 Vike Ragnar – guitars 
 Astaroth – drums

Discography

Studio albums
 Morgenröte – Der Schrei nach Finsternis (1996)
 Drachenblut (1998)
 Infernal Satanic Verses (1999)
 The Great Beast (2001)
 Damien (2002)
 Open the Gates of Hell (2003)
 The Bloody Path of God (2006)
 Mystic Circle (2022)
 Erzdämon (2023)

EPs
 Kriegsgötter II (2000)

Demos
 Dark Passion (1994)
 Von Kriegern und Helden (1995)
 Die Götter der Urväter (1996)

Compilation albums
 Unholy Chronicles (1992–2004) (2004)

References

External links
 Official MySpace profile
 Album "Drachenblut", italian interview (1998)
 
 

German heavy metal musical groups
Musical groups established in 1992
Musical groups disestablished in 1993
Musical groups reestablished in 1994
Musical groups disestablished in 2007
Musical groups reestablished in 2021